Antoinette Nana Djimou Ida (born 2 August 1985 in Douala, Cameroon) is a Cameroonian-French heptathlete and pentathlete. She has won two
European Athletics Championships heptathlon gold medals (in 2012 and 2014) and two European Athletics Indoor Championships pentathlon gold medals (in 2011 and 2013). Her heptathlon personal best result is 6576 points, achieved at the 2012 Olympics in London.
.

Career

Nana Djimou finished 4th at the 2012 Olympics heptathlon in London, with a personal best of 6576 points.

Nana Djimou withdrew from the upcoming 2015 World Championships in Athletics after undergoing an operation in June 2015.

Personal bests

Outdoor
100 m: 11.78 (2008)
200 m: 24.36 (2011)
800 m: 2:15.22 (2014)
100 m hs: 12.96 (2012)
High jump: 1.83 m (2011)
Long jump: 6.43 m (2016)
Shot put: 16.17 m (2016)
Javelin throw: 57.27 m (2012)
Heptathlon: 6,576 (2012)

Indoor
60 m: 7.59 (2008)
800 m: 2:18.09 (2011)
60 m hs: 8.11 (2010 and 2011)
High jump: 1.84 m (2010)
Long jump: 6.44 m (2009)
Shot put: 15.52 m (2018)
Pentathlon: 4723 pts (2011)

Meetings
2006 Hypo-Meeting: 19th, 5700 pts
2007 Hypo-Meeting: 21st, 5749 pts
2008 Hypo-Meeting: 12th, 6189 pts
2010 Hypo-Meeting: 10th, 5994 pts
2011 Hypo-Meeting: 3rd, 6409 pts
2012 Hypo-Meeting: 12th, 6279 pts
2012 Décastar: 2nd, 6390 pts
2013 Hypo-Meeting: 10th, 6058 pts

International competitions

References

External links
 Antoinette Nana Djimou Ida Official Website
 
 Antoinette Nana Djimou Ida at the FFA
 
 

1985 births
Living people
Sportspeople from Douala
French heptathletes
French female athletes
Olympic athletes of France
Athletes (track and field) at the 2008 Summer Olympics
Athletes (track and field) at the 2012 Summer Olympics
Athletes (track and field) at the 2016 Summer Olympics
World Athletics Championships athletes for France
European Athletics Championships medalists
Cameroonian emigrants to France
French Athletics Championships winners